Alba is the Scottish Gaelic name for Scotland.

Alba or ALBA may also refer to:

Arts, entertainment and media

Fictional characters
 Alba (Darkstalkers), a character in the Japanese video game
 Alba (The Time Traveler's Wife), a character in the novel by Audrey Niffenegger
 Alba Meira, a character in the Japanese video game series King of Fighters
 Alba Trueba, a character in the novel The House of the Spirits by Chilean author Isabel Allende
 Quercus Alba, a character in the video game Ace Attorney Investigations: Miles Edgeworth

Video games
 Alba: A Wildlife Adventure, a 2020 game  developed by Ustwo Games

Films and television
 Alba (film), a 2016 Ecuadorian film
 BBC Alba, a Scottish Gaelic language digital television channel from the BBC
 Alba (TV series), a Spanish drama television series

Literature
 Alba (novel), a 1985 novel Daniel Odier
 Alba (poetry), a genre of Occitan poetry

Music
 Alba (Danish music ensemble)
 Alba Musica Kyo, a music group founded by Toyohiko Satoh
 "Alba", a song by Runrig from their 1987 album The Cutter and the Clan
 Alba (Allbina Bolatqyzy Nazarbayeva), a Kazakh singer signed under Juz Entertainment

Businesses and organizations

Brands and enterprises 
 Alba (brand), a British consumer electronics brand and manufacturing company owned by Sainsbury's
 Alba (watch), a sub-brand of Seiko Watch Corporation 
 ALBA, an American milk products company owned by the Hain Celestial Group
 Alba Engineering, an Italian motor racing company co-founded by Giorgio Stirano
 Alba Vineyard, a winery in New Jersey
 Aluminium Bahrain, or AlBa, an aluminum producer in Bahrain

Schools and universities
 ALBA Graduate Business School, a Greek academic institution
 Lebanese Academy of Fine Arts, (French: Académie Libanaise des Beaux-Arts (ALBA));

Other organisations
 Alba Party, a Scottish political party
 ALBA, formerly Bolivarian Alliance for the Peoples of Our America, an intergovernmental organization
 Autogestión Liberadora Buenos Aires, an Argentinian political party
 Operation Alba, a multinational peacekeeping force sent to Albania in 1997

People
 Alba (given name)
 Alba (surname)

Places

Italy
 Alba, Piedmont, a comune in the Province of Cuneo
 Alba Adriatica, a comune in the province of Teramo, Abruzzo
 Alba Fucens, an ancient town in the Province of L'Aquila, Abruzzo
 Alba Longa, an ancient city in the Province of Rome, Lazio
 Baldissero d'Alba, a comune in the Province of Cuneo, Piedmont
 Diano d'Alba, a comune in the Province of Cuneo, Piedmont
 Morro d'Alba, comune in the Province of Ancona, Marche
 Republic of Alba, a French revolutionary municipality in Piedmont, 1798
 Republic of Alba (1944), a short-lived state in Piedmont
 Serralunga d'Alba, a comune in the Province of Cuneo, Piedmont
 Vezza d'Alba, a comune in the Province of Cuneo, Piedmont

Romania
 Alba County, a county in Transylvania
 Alba Iulia, a city in Alba County, Transylvania
 Alba, a village in Hudeşti Commune, Botoşani County
 Alba, a village in Izvoarele Commune, Tulcea County
 Alba (Șușița), a tributary of the Șușița in Vrancea County

Spain
 Alba, Aragon, a municipio in the Province of Teruel
 Alba de Cerrato, a municipio in the Province of Palencia
  Alba de Tormes, a municipio in the Province of Salamanca, Castile and León
 Alba de Yeltes, a municipio in the Province of Salamanca, Castile and León
 Alba (Nalón), a tributary of the Nalón in the Redes Natural Park in Asturias

Ukraine
 Cetatea Alba, a former Romanian name of Bilhorod-Dnistrovskyi, a city and port 
 Fântâna Albă, now Bila Krynytsia, a village in Stary Vovchynets commune
 Snake Island (Black Sea), known as Alba to the Romans

United States
 Alba, Michigan, an unincorporated community in Antrim County
 Alba, Missouri, a city in Jasper County
 Alba, Pennsylvania, a borough in Bradford County
 Alba, Texas, a town divided between Wood County and Rains County
 Alba Township, Henry County, Illinois
 Alba Township, Jackson County, Minnesota

Science and technology

Biology
 A. alba (disambiguation), various species
 Alba (rabbit), a genetically-modified glowing rabbit
 Alba, a cultivar of Bergenia stracheyi
 Alba, a cultivar of sage Salvia officinalis
 Barn owl, Tyto alba, the common barn owl 
 Cattleya elongata f. alba, a Brazilian orchid variety
 Isotheca alba, a species of flowering plants belonging to the family Acanthaceae
 Linea alba (abdomen), Latin for white line, a fibrous structure that runs down the midline of the abdomen in humans and other vertebrates
 Linea alba (cheek), Latin for white line, in dentistry refers to  a horizontal streak on the buccal mucosa (inner surface of the cheek)
 Quercus alba, the white oak, a species of tree
 S. alba (disambiguation), various species
 Ulmus × hollandica 'Alba', a hybrid elm tree

Other uses in science
 ALBA (synchrotron), a Spanish synchrotron radiation facility
 Alba Mons, a volcano on Mars
 ALBA-1, a submarine communications cable between Cuba and Venezuela

Sport
 Alba (shinty team), a Scottish composite rules shinty–hurling team
 Alba Berlin, a German basketball club
 S.C. Alba, a Portuguese football club

Transportation

Motor vehicles
 Alba (1907 automobile), an Austrian vintage car
 Alba (1913 automobile), a French vintage car
 Alba (1952 automobile), a Portuguese car
 Alba (motorcycle), a 1920s German motorcycle

Ships
 SS Alba, a Panamanian ship wrecked off Cornwall, England, in 1938 and painted by Alfred Wallis
 SS Alba, a Chilean ship wrecked in 1928

See also
Alb, liturgical vestment in Christian churches
Albion, oldest name of the island of Great Britain
Alban (disambiguation)
Album (disambiguation)
Albus (disambiguation)